P. Somarajan (born on 14 July 1962) is the judge of Kerala High Court.The  High Court of Kerala  is the highest court in the Indian state of Kerala and in the Union Territory of Lakshadweep. The High Court of Kerala is headquartered at Ernakulam, Kochi

Early life and education
Somarajan was born at Kollam, Kerala. Completed his schooling from PKPM NSS U.P School, Madannada, Kollam and VVHS School, Ayathil, Kollam. Graduated from Sree Narayana College, Kollam and obtained a law degree from Government Law College, Thiruvananthapuram.

Career
Somarajan enrolled as an Advocate in 1988. He joined Kerala Judicial Service 2001 as District and Sessions Judge and served as Additional District Judge, Palakkad, as Additional District & Sessions Judge & MACT, North Paravur, as Additional District & Sessions Judge, Thiruvananthapuram. He was promoted as grade District & Sessions Judge in 2009 and served as Enquiry Commissioner & Special Judge, Kottayam. Thereafter he was promoted as Super Time District Judge in 2013 and served as District & Sessions Judge at Alappuzha and Pathanamthitta. On 5 October 2016 he was appointed as additional judge of Kerala High Court and became permanent from 16 March 2018.

References

External links
 High Court of Kerala

Living people
Judges of the Kerala High Court
21st-century Indian judges
1962 births
People from Kollam